Alcaligenes pacificus is a bacterium which has been reclassified to Deleya pacifica.

References

Burkholderiales
Bacteria described in 1972